Sven Lissek (born 1 March 1992) is a German former professional footballer who played as a goalkeeper.

Youth 
Lissek began playing for his local youth soccer team, FC Sexau, in 1996. He was recruited to play for the SC Freiburg youth team in 2004.

Club career

SC Freiburg II 
Lissek signed a contract with SC Freiburg II in 2012 after progressing through every age group of the SC Freiburg youth system.

Furman University  
In 2012 Lissek moved to the United States to pursue a Bachelor's Degree in Economics at Furman University while playing for the Furman  soccer team. His standout performances on the field as well as in the classroom earned him a spot on the  NSCAA Academic All American Team in 2015. He collected 28 clean sheets in 60 starts and set a Southern Conference record for single season shutouts in 2015. Lissek received many accolades, including being named one of Top Drawer Soccer's "Top 10 goalkeepers in men's college soccer".

TSG Neustrelitz 
After briefly playing for FC Emmendingen, Lissek signed a contract with TSG Neustrelitz on 3 July 2016.

References

External links 

1992 births
Living people
German footballers
Association football goalkeepers
Furman Paladins men's soccer players
TSG Neustrelitz players
FC Emmendingen players
Regionalliga players